Mortadelo is a Spanish comic magazine published from 1970 to 1991 first by Editorial Bruguera and subsequently by Ediciones B. The magazine is named after the popular Mort & Phil comic series created by Francisco Ibáñez.

History
Mortadelo endured three major historical stages under the direction of Vicente Palomares, Jordi Bayona, and Armando Matías Guiu.

1970–1983
The first issue of Mortadelo was released on 23 November 1970 and was given out free of charge by the magazine Tío Vivo. Subsequent issues cost 6 pesetas. The earliest issues feature the work series of Ibánez, Vázquez, and Escobar in addition to others such as El Corsario de Hierro. The magazine, along with Super Pulgarcito replaced Gran Pulgarcito, which was originally published by Vicente Palomares Melo.

The publication spanned 32 pages (16 of the pages were full color while the other 16 were bi-color) and a print size of 26 x 18 cm.

1984–1986
In 1984, the magazines Mortadelo and Super Mortadelo merged. The resulting magazine was called Mortadelo, but maintained the numbering of Super Mortadelo.

1987–1991
The third stage was published by Ediciones B and sold at a price of 140 pesetas (10 U.S. dollars). It featured comic artists such as Joaquín Cera, Maikel, Marco, Miguel and Juan Carlos Ramis.

Main series
Mort and Phil by Francisco Ibáñez
Zipi y Zape by Escobar
La Abuelita Paz by Vázquez
El Corsario de Hierro by Víctor Mora/Ambrós
Anacleto, agente secreto by Vázquez
El repórter Tribulete by Cifré
Topolino by Figueras
Carpanta by Escobar
13, Rue del Percebe by Ibáñez
Pafman by Cera
Las hermanas Gilda by Vázquez

Awards
 Aro de Oro in 1972, 1973, 1974 and 1975
 Aro de Plata in 1971 and 1976

References

Sources 
Jordi Canyissa. (2015). Raf. El 'gentleman' de Bruguera. Barcelona: Amaníaco Ediciones. Legal deposit: B-26644-2015. .

José María Delhom. (1989). Catálogo del tebeo en España. 1865/1980. Barcelona: Círculo del Comic, S.A./CESA. .
Antoni Guiral. (November 2007). Los tebeos de nuestra infancia: La Escuela Bruguera (1964-1986). Colección Magnum nº 7. Barcelona: Ediciones El Jueves, S. A. Legal deposit: B-50353-2007. .
Juan Antonio Ramirez. (December 1975). La historieta cómica de postguerra. Madrid: Editorial Cuadernos para el Diálogo, Colección Memoria y Comunicación. Legal deposit: M. 38.325.

External links
 Mortadelo: el tebeo que reinó en los 70 by Carlos De Gregorio in 13 Rue del Percebe.

1970 establishments in Spain
1991 disestablishments in Spain
Comics magazines published in Spain
Defunct magazines published in Spain
Magazines about comics
Magazines established in 1970
Magazines disestablished in 1991
Mort & Phil
Spanish-language magazines
Weekly magazines published in Spain